Netherton is a village, near Huddersfield, in the Kirklees metropolitan borough of West Yorkshire, England. It is 2 miles (3 km) south-west of the town centre on the road to Meltham. Netherton together with South Crosland have a population of 3,702 according to the 2001 census.

It is part of the Crosland Moor and Netherton ward of the Colne Valley parliamentary constituency. 
It has a junior school and an infant school.

It also has a junior football club who play at South Crosland Junior school and Hawkroyd bank. They were also the founder members of the Huddersfield & District Junior football league. It also has a 3 Team open age football team in the Huddersfield District League.

Notable people 
Ian Berry, artist
Joe Skarz, professional footballer currently at Bury

See also
Listed buildings in Crosland Moor and Netherton

References

External links

 Picture of Meltham Road, Netherton - Geograph.org

Villages in West Yorkshire
Geography of Huddersfield
Holme Valley